The Frenchside Fishing Village is located in Two Rivers, Wisconsin. It was added to the National Register of Historic Places in 1987.

History
The area was originally largely inhabited by French Canadian immigrants. It became the longest-running commercial fishing district on the Great Lakes and would come to have the largest fleet as well.

References

Fishing communities in the United States
Historic districts on the National Register of Historic Places in Wisconsin
Geography of Manitowoc County, Wisconsin
French-Canadian American history
French-Canadian culture in Wisconsin
National Register of Historic Places in Manitowoc County, Wisconsin